Grant County is a county in central Indiana in the United States Midwest. At the time of the 2020 census, the population was 66,674.  The county seat is Marion. Important paleontological discoveries, dating from the Pliocene epoch, have been made at the Pipe Creek Sinkhole in Grant County.

History
Grant County was formed in 1831 by settlers from Kentucky and Virginia. It was named for Captains Samuel and Moses Grant of Kentucky, who were killed fighting indigenous warriors north of the Ohio River. Their home county was also named for them, Grant County, Kentucky.

In 1831, Martin Boots and David Branson each donated 30 acres of land to begin a settlement called Marion. This land was on the north side of a fast-flowing and scenic river which the Miami Indians called Mississinewa. Marion was designated as the County Seat.

As the county was developed for agriculture, the county seat became a center of trade and business, as well as government and the court system. On 7 August 1930, a mob of an estimated 5,000 people took three African-American men, Thomas Shipp and Abram Smith, both 19, and James Cameron, 16, from the county jail. They were suspects in a robbery/murder and rape. The first two were hanged from trees in the courthouse square. Cameron was spared and later became a civil rights activist. This was the last lynching in Indiana.

In 1982, Stephen Johnson was elected as Grant County's first full-time prosecutor. He served for five terms, from 1983 through 2002.

Geography
Grant County consists of low rolling hills, covered with vegetation and devoted to agriculture or urban development. The Mississinewa River flows northwesterly through the center of the county toward Mississinewa Lake in adjacent Miami County. The highest terrain consists of two rises in southeast Upland, at 950' (290m) ASL.

Adjacent counties

Grant County shares a border with nine neighboring counties, more than any other county in Indiana.
 Huntington County - northeast
 Wells County - northeast
 Blackford County - east
 Delaware County - southeast
 Madison County - south
 Tipton County - southwest
 Howard County - west
 Miami County - northwest
 Wabash County - northwest

Major highways

  - Interstate Highway
  - Federal Highway
  - State Highway
  - State Highway
  - State Highway
  - State Highway
  - State Highway
  - State Highway
  - State Highway
  - State Highway
  - State Highway

Climate and weather

Government

The county government is a constitutional body, granted specific powers by the Constitution of Indiana and the Indiana Code.

County Council: The legislative branch of the county government; controls spending and revenue collection in the county. Representatives, elected to four-year terms from county districts, are responsible for setting salaries, the annual budget, and special spending. The council also has limited authority to impose local taxes, in the form of an income and property tax that is subject to state level approval, excise taxes, and service taxes.

Board of Commissioners: The executive body of the county; commissioners are elected county-wide to staggered four-year terms. One commissioner serves as president. The commissioners are charged with executing the acts legislated by the council, collecting revenue, and managing the day-to-day functions of the county government.

Court: The county maintains a small claims court that can handle some civil cases. The judge on the court is elected to a term of four years and must be a member of the Indiana Bar Association. The judge is assisted by a constable who is also elected to a four-year term. In some cases, court decisions can be appealed to the state level circuit court.

County Officials: The county has several other elected offices, including sheriff, coroner, auditor, treasurer, recorder, surveyor and circuit court clerk, elected to four-year terms. Members elected to county government positions are required to declare party affiliations and to be residents of the county.

Grant County is part of Indiana's 5th congressional district; Indiana Senate districts 17, 19 and 21; and Indiana House of Representatives districts 31, 32 and 82.

Demographics

2020 census

2010 United States Census
As of the 2010 United States Census, there were 70,061 people, 27,245 households, and 18,000 families in the county. The racial makeup of the county was 88.2% white, 7.0% black or African American, 0.6% Asian, 0.3% American Indian, 1.4% from other races, and 2.4% from two or more races. Those of Hispanic or Latino origin made up 3.6% of the population. In terms of ancestry, 19.5% were German, 12.4% were American, 10.0% were Irish, and 9.0% were English.

Of the 27,245 households, 29.4% had children under the age of 18 living with them, 48.0% were married couples living together, 13.4% had a female householder with no husband present, 33.9% were non-families, and 28.8% of all households were made up of individuals. The average household size was 2.39 and the average family size was 2.89. The median age was 39.5 years.

The median income for a household in the county was $47,697 and the median income for a family was $49,860. Males had a median income of $40,146 versus $28,588 for females. The per capita income for the county was $19,792. About 12.0% of families and 17.0% of the population were below the poverty line, including 25.0% of those under age 18 and 9.4% of those age 65 or over.

Localities

Cities
 Gas City
 Jonesboro
 Marion

Towns

 Fairmount
 Fowlerton
 Matthews
 Swayzee
 Sweetser
 Upland
 Van Buren

Census-designated places

 Herbst
 Jalapa
 Landess
 Mier
 Point Isabel
 Sims

Unincorporated communities

 Arcana
 Cole
 Farrville
 Fox
 Friendly Corner
 Hackleman
 Hanfield
 Jadden
 Michaelsville
 Normal
 Radley
 Rigdon
 Roseburg
 Weaver

Townships

 Center
 Fairmount
 Franklin
 Green
 Jefferson
 Liberty
 Mill
 Monroe
 Pleasant
 Richland
 Sims
 Van Buren
 Washington

Education
School districts include:
 Eastbrook Community School Corporation
 Madison-Grant United School Corporation
 Marion Community Schools
 Mississinewa Community School Corporation
 Oak Hill United School Corporation

See also
 National Register of Historic Places listings in Grant County, Indiana

References

 
Indiana counties
1831 establishments in Indiana
Populated places established in 1831